Leitenburg Castle (a.k.a. Leutenberg, Leutenburg, sometimes Leutemberg, Lože Castle) is a castle in Lože, a village in the Municipality of Vipava in southwestern Slovenia. It was originally built in the 12th century  but it was later reconstructed and rebuilt.

References

Buildings and structures completed in the 12th century
Castles in the Slovene Littoral
Municipality of Vipava